Deivapiravi may refer to:
 Deivapiravi (1960 film), an Indian Tamil-language film
 Deivapiravi (1985 film), an Indian Tamil-language romantic drama film